William Gould may refer to:

 William Gould (naturalist) (1715–1799), English cleric and naturalist
 William Buelow Gould (1801–1853), Australian convict and painter
 William Gould (actor) (1886–1969), American actor
 William B. Gould (1837–1923), escaped slave and veteran of the American Civil War
 William B. Gould IV, American lawyer and law professor
 William Monk Gould (1856–1923), British composer of light music
 William Tracy Gould (1799–1882), American lawyer and founder of the Augusta Law School
 William S. Baring-Gould (1913–1967), Sherlock Holmes scholar
 William Gould (aka William O'Brien), one of the Manchester Martyrs
 Billy Gould (born 1963), American musician and producer
 Willie Gould (1886–?), English footballer for Bradford City and Manchester City
 Billy Gould (comedian) (1869–1950), American vaudeville comedian

See also
 William Gould Dow (1895–1999), American scientist
William Gould Newman, politician
William Gould Young (1902–1980), chemist and professor